Norbert Bartel is a Canadian physicist and astronomer, currently a Distinguished Research Professor at York University.

Education 
Studying in Germany, Bartel received a Vordiplom in Physics from University of Hamburg in 1972 and  a  M.Sc. Diplom in Physics from the University of Bonn, in 1975. He received a PhD in Physics and Astronomy from the University of Bonn and the Max Planck Institute for Radio Astronomy in 1978.

Career 
From 1983 until 1992 Bartel was a research associate at the Harvard-Smithsonian Center for Astrophysics. In 1992, he joined the faculty of the York University Department of Physics and Astronomy.

His research involves using very-long-baseline interferometry (VLBI) radio astronomy to study the structure and evolution of supernova remnants, pulsar wind nebulae and active galactic nuclei.

Awards and recognition 
In 1978, Bartel received the Max Planck Society Otto Hahn Medal. In 2006, he was appointed a Distinguished Research Professor at York University.

References

1950 births
Living people
Academic staff of York University
Canadian physicists
21st-century Canadian astronomers
University of Hamburg alumni
University of Bonn alumni
20th-century German astronomers
German emigrants to Canada